is a semimonthly Japanese  manga magazine that features photos of gravure idols. It has been published by Hakusensha on the second and fourth Friday of each month since 1992.

History and profile
Young Animal was launched in May 1992. Young Animal is issued on the second and fourth Friday of each month in saddle-stapled B5 format. Its headquarters is in Tokyo.

A typical issue consists of about 300 black-and-white pulp pages of manga wrapped in about 20 slick pages of color pinup photos of teenage girls in bikinis (generally pop stars and gravure idols). Advertising (other than house ads for Hakusensha) appears only in the form of a few ads in the back pages and on the inside and back covers. As of 2015, circulation is approximately 119,000 copies. Each issue features about 15 different stories, mostly serial stories tending toward sexy romantic comedy, fantasy, and epic adventure, with a number of humorous  or four-panel gag strips.

Popular long-running series appearing in Young Animal include the medieval dark fantasy adventure Berserk and the modern day married-life sex comedy Futari Ecchi (both over 300 chapters as of 2010). A number of Young Animal manga series have been adapted into anime.

Titles serialized in Young Animal are published as  volumes by Hakusensha under the Young Animal Comics imprint. Prior to June 2016, volumes were published under the Jets Comics imprint.

Young Animal has also inspired several spin-off magazines: Young Animal Arashi (2000–2018); Young Animal Island (2004–2013), briefly relaunched as Young Animal Innocent (2014); and Young Animal Zero (2019–present).

Manga artists and series featured in Young Animal
Names are listed in alphabetical order, with the family name given last.

 Katsu Aki
 Angel Hard
 Futari Ecchi (Step Up Love Story; US: Manga Sutra) (1997–ongoing)
 My Silver-Colored House
 Show
 Ryuta Amazume
 Nana to Kaoru (2009–2016) complete
 Hikaru Asada and Takahiro Seguchi
 Sickness Unto Death (2010) complete
 Coolkyousinnjya
 The Idaten Deities Know Only Peace (story by Amahara) (2018–ongoing)
 Kou Fumizuki
 Ai Yori Aoshi (1998–2005) complete
 Umi no Misaki (2007–2014) complete
 Boku to Rune to Aoarashi (October 2015 – October 2016) complete
 Shigemitsu Harada
 Yuria 100 Shiki  (2006–2010) complete
 Sora Inoue
 Mai Ball! (2012–2019) complete
 Hiroshi Itaba
 Mouse (story by Satoru Akahori) (2000–2004) complete
 Kanji Kawashita
 Ateya no Tsubaki  (2008–ongoing)
 Kentaro Miura
 Berserk (1992–ongoing)
 Giganto Maxia (2013–2014)
 Japan (written by Buronson)
 Reiji Miyajima
 Shiunji-ke no Kodomo-tachi (2022–ongoing)
 Tomochika Miyano
 Yubisaki Milk Tea  (2003–2010) complete
 Kōji Mori
 Holyland (2000–2008) complete
 Jisatsutō (2008–2016) complete
 Ashita Morimi
 This Ugly Yet Beautiful World (story by Gainax) (2004–2005) complete
 Nanki Satō and Akira Kiduki
 Usotsuki Paradox (2009–2012) complete
 Yokusaru Shibata
 Air Master  (1997–2006) complete
 Naoki Shigeno
 Nobunaga no Shinobi (2008–ongoing)
 Tarō Shinonome
 KimiKiss: Various Heroines (2006–2009) complete
 Amagami: Precious Diary  (2009–2010) complete
 Kaoru Shintani
 Buttobi CPU  (US: I Dream of Mimi) (1993–1997) complete
 Kazuyoshi Takeda
 Peleliu: Guernica of Paradise  (2016–2021)
 Izumi Takemoto
 Twinkle Star Nonnonzie
 Sakura Takeuchi
 Chocotto Sister  (story by Go Zappa) (2003–2007) complete
 Yutaka Tanaka
Ai-Ren (1999–2002)
 Tugeneko
 Ueno-san wa Bukiyō (2015–2022)
 Chica Umino
 March Comes in like a Lion (2007–ongoing)
Kiminori Wakasugi
 Detroit Metal City  (2005–2010) complete
 Shizuya Wazarai
 Kentō Ankoku Den Cestvs (1997–2009) complete
 Kentō Shitō Den Cestvs (2010–2014) moved to Young Animal Arashi
 Makoto Yotsuba and Miyū (story by Ryo Mizuno)
 Record of Grancrest War  (2016–2019)
Harada Shigemitsu and Seguchi Takahiro
YuriCam: Yurika no Campus Life (2010–2013)
Sekina Aoi and Ryō Tsuzura
Boku no Suki na Hito ga Suki na Hito (2022–future)

Notes

References

External links
  
 

1992 establishments in Japan
Hakusensha magazines
Magazines established in 1992
Magazines published in Tokyo
Semimonthly manga magazines published in Japan
Seinen manga magazines